ThDr. PaedDr. Mgr. art. Peter Dufka, PhD, SJ (born 8 November 1963 Handlová, Czechoslovakia now Slovakia) is Slovak Roman Catholic priest, Professor at the Pontifical Oriental Institute in Rome, Radio Vatican co-worker and Pro-Rector of Collegium Russicum (since 31 January 2017).

Biography

Study  
He comes from a family of four children, three of whom became priests. He studied at the Secondary Industrial School in Handlová in the years 1977-1981. After finishing school in 1981 he continued studying at another secondary school – Conservatory in Žilina, playing double bass. Since 1985, during his studies at Conservatory, he had begun the secret preparation for priesthood in the Society of Jesus. He finished his basic theological studies in 1996 at the Theological Institute (at present Faculty of Theology at Trnava University in Bratislava). However, during his theological studies, he continued with the music study at The Academy of Performing Arts in Bratislava, where he graduated in 1992.

He was ordained priest on 29 June 1996 in Bratislava by Bishop Peter Dubovský. His older brother, Juraj Dufka, was ordained together with him. In 1999, his younger brother Vlastimil Dufka received Holy Orders. All three Dufka brothers have academic education in arts.
After his ordination, Dufka worked in the pastoral care in Ružomberok at Exaltation of the Holy Cross Church as a helping priest and the teacher of religion at Secondary Medical School. Since 31 July 1997, he has worked in the Slovak section of Vatican Radio. He returned to Slovakia in 1999, where he spent his pastoral-formative year in the Retreat House in Prešov. He returned to Rome again in 2000 where he began studying theology at the Pontifical Gregorian University. Here, in 2002, he obtained the Licentiate of Fundamental Theology. He stayed in Rome until 2006 and continued his Doctorate in Theology and graduated in 2008. At the same time, he obtained the Doctorate in Education at the Catholic University in Ružomberok. 
Since September 2006, he had ministered at the Sacred Heart Church in Košice and was the director of The “Michal Lacko” Centre of Spirituality East-West. At the same time, he was an external professor at The Pontifical Oriental Institute in Rome. He went to Rome in November 2009 where he became the head of Vatican Radio Slovak section. He has worked there until October 2011, since when he works at The Pontifical Oriental Institute. He still cooperates with Vatican Radio and, at present, he is also the helping spiritual at The Pontifical Nepomucenum College in Rome. Since 2013 he teaches at the Pontifical Gregorian University in Roma.

Vatican Radio work 
He began work in Vatican Radio on 2 August 1997, when he became the editor. He became the head of Slovak section in November 2009. In October 2011, he became a lecturer at the university; therefore, he left the leading position and became an external co-worker. In Vatican Radio, he broadcast the regular rubric “The spirituality of contemporary man” and contributed to the rubric “The interview of the week”.

Education and academic activity 
He began teaching Ethics and Religion in 1996 at the Secondary Medical School of Marie-Therese Scherer in Ružomberok and Aesthetics in 2007 at the Faculty of Education at the Catholic University in Košice. Since 2011, he teaches Byzantine music, Aesthetics and Christian spirituality at The Pontifical Oriental Institute in Rome
Within the spirituality of the Christian East, he has been running the following  courses: Fundamentals of spirituality, Prayer in the Christian East, Monasticism and religious life, Distinction and spiritual warfare, Spiritual accompaniment.
Within the seminars and other lectures, he focuses on the topics such as: Beauty as an expression and an incentive of the faith, Aesthetic perception of spiritual music, Byzantine music. In addition, he supervises license and doctoral theses.

Work 
Dufka is the author of several publications regarding spirituality and musical arts. He makes use of his musical education in chamber performances.

Bibliography 
 Theological perception of music – convergence of five views, Ružomberok, 2007,  
 L'arte musicale come espressione e stimolo della fede. La Passione secondo Giovanni di J.S. Bach, Rome, 2008, p. 119 (Italy)
 L'arte musicale come espressione e stimolo della fede. La Passione secondo Giovanni di J.S. Bach, Trnava, 2009,   
 Percezione teologica del'arte musicale - una convergenza fra cingue impostazioni, Ružomberok, Verbum, 2012, 
 Spirituality of contemporary man, Trnava, Dobrá kniha 2014,

Professional articles 
He contributes to Slovak journals for the religious:
 Consecrated life – Monthly magazine dedicated to the education of consecrated persons  
 Faith and Life – Theological journal led by the Jesuits in Slovakia 
 Catholic Newspaper – Catholic weekly newspaper of 80 000 copies 
 Missionary – monthly Slovak Catholics

Music  
 CD: Veni Creator, Chorus Salvatoris, vocal-instrumental sacral compositions [2]

Literature 
 Uhrinová, Miriam: Vybrané didaktické aspekty prírodovedného vzdelávania v materskej škole, Ružomberok, 2011.  
 Plašienková, Z.; Leško, V.; Szotek B.: Filozofické myslenie v stredoeurópskom priestore - tradície a súčasnosť, Košice, 2011, s. 441.
 Tavel, Peter: Chápanie hodnoty podľa Viktora Emanuela Frankla, Olomouc, 2011
 Karwatowska, Malgorzata; Siwiec, Adam: O wartosciach a wartosciowaniu historia - literatura edukacia, Chelm, 2012.

References

External links  
 Jezuita Peter Dufka v TV NOE
 Chorus Salvatoris
 http://www.rtvs.sk/televizia/archiv/9467/77615
 https://web.archive.org/web/20160626122355/http://www.unipio.org/index.php/biblioteca/catalogo 
 https://web.archive.org/web/20150227202915/http://sk.radiovaticana.va/index.asp - are the monthly reporting (8 to 10 minutes) of Vatican Radio on the topic of spirituality. Up to now, more than 20 years have been carried out.
 https://www.youtube.com/watch?v=P4fJk9nYlXc
 https://www.youtube.com/watch?v=djD08XuOpGw

 

Slovak priests
Slovak Roman Catholic priests
1963 births
Slovak Jesuits
Living people
Academic staff of the Pontifical Oriental Institute